Events from the year 2022 in Scotland.

Incumbents 
First Minister: Nicola Sturgeon
Secretary of State: Alister Jack

Events 
20 March – 2022 Census for Scotland. (one year later than the national census in the rest of the UK).
5 May – 2022 Scottish local elections.
May – Announcement that Dunfermline in Fife is one of 8 places to be awarded city status in the United Kingdom as part of this year's celebrations for the Platinum Jubilee of Elizabeth II.
 14 June – Nicola Sturgeon, launches the first of a series of papers setting out the case for her proposed second Scottish independence referendum.
10–14 July – 150th Open Championship (golf) at the Old Course at St Andrews.
19 July – Warmest ever temperature in Scotland recorded, 35.1°C (95.1°F) at Floors Castle in the Borders.
15 August – Scotland becomes the first country in the world to make free sanitary products available to women after legislation passed by the Scottish Parliament comes into force.
22 August – Seagreen offshore wind farm, off the Angus coast, begins generating.
August–September – 2022 Scotland bin strikes.
8 September – Elizabeth II dies at Balmoral Castle.
13 September – Margaret Ferrier, the MP who travelled by train from London to Scotland after receiving a positive COVID test in September 2020, is given 270 hours of community service after previously pleading guilty at Glasgow Sheriff Court to culpably and recklessly exposing the public to the virus.
22 September – Aberdeen's last paper mill, Stoneywood, enters administration, having operated on the site for 252 years.
23 November – The Supreme Court rules that the Scottish Government cannot hold a second Scottish independence referendum without the UK government's consent.
22 December – MSPs vote to approve the Gender Recognition Reform (Scotland) Bill by 86 votes to 39.

Deaths 
 9 February – Fiona Denison, doctor and academic
 2 March – John Stahl, actor (born 1953)
 13 March – Mary Lee, singer (born 1921)
 24 March – John McLeod, composer (born 1934)
 13 May – Angus Grossart, merchant banker and newspaper executive (born 1937)
 12 July – Joan Lingard, writer (born 1932)
 11 August – Darius Campbell Danesh, singer and reality star (born 1980)
 14 October – Robbie Coltrane, actor and comedian (born 1950)
 26 November – Doddie Weir, rugby union player and motor neuron disease campaigner (born 1970)

See also 
2022 in Northern Ireland
2022 in Wales
2022 in the United Kingdom
Politics of Scotland

References 

 
Scotland
2020s in Scotland
Years of the 21st century in Scotland